Actinopus itaqui is a species of mygalomorph spider in the family Actinopodidae. It can be found in Brazil.

The specific name itaqui refers to the municipality of Itaqui, Brazil.

References 

Spiders described in 2020
itaqui
Spiders of Brazil